Jenny Wallis is a former Hong Kong international lawn bowler.

Bowls career
She won a bronze medal in the fours at the 1990 Commonwealth Games in Auckland with Naty Rozario, Angela Chau and Yee Lai Lee. In addition she competed in the fours at the 1994 Commonwealth Games.

She won a fours silver medal and a triples bronze medal at the 1993 Asia Pacific Bowls Championships in Victoria, Canada.

Personal life
She married Ken Wallis and they  moved to Australia when Jenny was appointed director of the Hong Kong Economic & Trade Office in Sydney.

References

Hong Kong female bowls players
Living people
Date of birth missing (living people)
Commonwealth Games medallists in lawn bowls
Commonwealth Games bronze medallists for Hong Kong
Year of birth missing (living people)
Bowls players at the 1990 Commonwealth Games
Medallists at the 1990 Commonwealth Games